Geoffrey Baba Kizito (born 2 February 1993) is a Ugandan international footballer who plays for Vietnamese club Than Quang Ninh, as a midfielder.

Club career
Born in Kampa, he spent the 2012 and 2013 seasons in Vietnam with Xuan Thanh Sai Gon. In early January 2014 he signed a deal to play for Kenya Premier League champions Gor Mahia. He returned to Vietnam for the 2015 season, with Than Quang Ninh. In 2018 he joined Saigon. He moved to Than Quảng Ninh for the 2020 season.

International career
He made his international debut for Uganda in 2012.

Personal life
In 2017 he became a naturalised citizen of Vietnam, under the name Trần Trung Hiếu.

References

1993 births
Living people
Ugandan footballers
Uganda international footballers
Xuan Thanh Saigon Cement FC players
Gor Mahia F.C. players
Than Quang Ninh FC players
Association football midfielders
Ugandan expatriate footballers
Ugandan expatriate sportspeople in Vietnam
Expatriate footballers in Vietnam
Ugandan expatriate sportspeople in Kenya
Expatriate footballers in Kenya
2017 Africa Cup of Nations players
Naturalized citizens of Vietnam